Larrington St Anthony Walker (1946 – 3 September 2017) was a Jamaican-born British actor.

Born in Kingston, Jamaica, Walker emigrated to the UK in 1956. Walker starred in the British television drama Taboo, and starred in movies such as Second Coming (2014), and Human Traffic (2000), as well as appearing in Minder (1982), The Bill and Inspector Morse. For three seasons from 2008, he was a member of the Royal Shakespeare Company and performed in productions of Julius Caesar, The Winter’s Tale, King Lear, and Antony and Cleopatra, among others.

Walker also worked with Lenny Henry in the BBC Radio 4 comedy Rudy’s Rare Records. Walker also  played Rudy, the father of Adam (Henry), in the 2014 stage version which was performed both at the Birmingham Rep and the Hackney Empire.

He died on 3 September 2017. His son reported on Facebook that his father died in Guadeloupe on a day off from filming there.

References

External links 
 

1947 births
2017 deaths
English male television actors
English people of Jamaican descent
People from Kingston, Jamaica